Clovis Kabongo Malemba is a politician, president of the Action Démocratique Nationale (ADENA). party in the Democratic Republic of the Congo. Candidate in the 2006 presidential election.

References

Democratic Republic of the Congo politicians
Living people
Year of birth missing (living people)
21st-century Democratic Republic of the Congo people